Caonillas may refer to:

Places
Caonillas, Aibonito, Puerto Rico, a barrio
Caonillas Abajo, Utuado, Puerto Rico, a barrio
Caonillas Abajo, Villalba, Puerto Rico, a barrio
Caonillas Arriba, Utuado, Puerto Rico, a barrio
Caonillas Arriba, Villalba, Puerto Rico, a barrio